Pisindelis, ruled c.460–450 BCE, was a tyrant of Caria, from its capital Halicarnassus, under the Achaemenid Empire. He was the son of Artemisia I of Caria, and part of the Lygdamid dynasty.

He was said to be a young man already at the time his mother Artemisia fought at the head of the Carian fleet at the Battle of Salamis (479 BCE) under King Xerxes I. He is mentioned by Herodotus as he described the involvement of his mother at Salamis:

He probably had to abandon his throne around 452-449 BCE. His son was Lygdamis II, last tyrant of the Lygdamid dynasty, before Caria joined the Athenian alliance of the Delian League for about 50 years.

References

Ancient Halicarnassians
Lygdamid dynasty
Achaemenid satraps of Caria
5th-century rulers in Asia